Prosody (formerly lxmppd) is a cross-platform XMPP server written in Lua. Its development goals include low resource usage, ease of use, and extensibility. Prosody uses the default XMPP ports, 5222 and 5269, for client-to-server and server-to-server communications respectively.

History 
Prosody development was started by Matthew Wild in August 2008 and its first release, 0.1.0, was made in December 2008.

Prosody was initially licensed under the GNU General Public License (version 2), but later switched to the MIT License in its 3rd release.

Notable deployments 
The XMPP Standards Foundation runs Prosody on xmpp.org, and uses the chatroom feature for meetings for various XSF teams.

Identi.ca the micro-blogging service uses Prosody to deliver IM notifications.

Remember the Milk uses Prosody to deliver IM based reminders.

Collabora runs Prosody on proxies.telepathy.im to provide file transfer proxy lookup for Telepathy (and therefore Empathy).

Peter Saint-Andre (the executive director of the XMPP Standards Foundation) has run Prosody on http://stpeter.im.

See also 

 Comparison of XMPP server software

References

External links

The Prosody project's source code repository
RTC Quick Start Guide explains how to set up all the components needed for real-time communication, including Prosody as the XMPP server

Instant messaging server software
Free software programmed in Lua (programming language)
Software using the MIT license